Swans Way may refer to:

Swans Way (band), a British pop group
Swan's Way (footpath), a long-distance footpath in England
Swann's Way, a volume of the novel In Search of Lost Time